Paul Moore is a Canadian former soccer player who played most notably in the USL A-League, National Professional Soccer League, and with various Canadian soccer leagues.

Club career

Early career 
Moore began his professional career in the Canadian National Soccer League with St. Catharines Wolves in 1995 and had a two-year tenure with the club. During his tenure with St. Catharines he achieved the CNSL Championship, and two league cups.

Toronto Lynx 
On April, 1997 he signed with expansion franchise the Toronto Lynx in the USL A-League, his signing was announced in a press conference which revealed the team roster. Moore made his debut for the club on April 12, 1997 in the Lynx's first official match against Jacksonville Cyclones; the game would eventually result in a 3-1 defeat for the fledgling side. In total, he would appear in 2 matches for Toronto.

For the remainder of the year he returned to the CNSL with Toronto Supra, and featured in the CNSL Championship final against former club St. Catharines Wolves.

CPSL 
In 1998, Moore signed with the Toronto Olympians of the newly formed Canadian Professional Soccer League. Midway through the season he was transferred to Glen Shields. In 2000, he signed with Toronto Croatia where he finished second in scoring for the club. He also assisted in securing the CPSL Championship after Croatia defeated the Toronto Olympians by a score of 2-1. The following season he returned to the Olympians.

Indoor career 
He played at the indoor level with the Edmonton Drillers in the America-based National Professional Soccer League during the 1999-00 indoor season. He would appear in 4 matches and record a goal.

Ontario Cup 
In 2009, he played with Markham Soccer Club in the Ontario Cup tournament.

Honors
St. Catharines Wolves
 CNSL Championship: 1995 
 CNSL League Cup: 1995, 1996
Toronto Croatia 
CPSL Championship: 2000

References 

Living people
Canadian Soccer League (1998–present) players
Canadian soccer players
St. Catharines Roma Wolves players
Toronto Croatia players
Toronto Lynx players
Toronto (Mississauga) Olympians players
SC Toronto players
A-League (1995–2004) players
Canadian National Soccer League players
York Region Shooters players
Association football forwards
Year of birth missing (living people)
Edmonton Drillers (1996–2000) players
National Professional Soccer League (1984–2001) players